Kabul Eagles (Pashto/Dari:  Kābəl Bāzān) is one of eight regional level first-class cricket teams in Afghanistan. The team, based in the country's capital city Kabul, was created to join the five regional sides in the Ahmad Shah Abdali 4-day Tournament, which has first-class status from 2017 onwards. The Kabul team also compete in the Afghan Shpageeza Cricket League Twenty20 competition (which has List A status from 2017) using the name Kabul Eagles. They were the 2016 and 2020 champions in the league.

Honours
Shpageeza Cricket League
 2016
 2020

References 

Cricket in Afghanistan
Afghan first-class cricket teams